Bašino Selo is a village in the municipality of Veles, North Macedonia.

Demographics
According to the 2002 census, the village had a total of 814 inhabitants. Ethnic groups in the village include:

Macedonians 802
Serbs 8
Aromanians 1
Others 3

Sports
The local football club FK Ilinden 1955 Bašino plays in the Macedonian Third Football League.

References

External links

Villages in Veles Municipality
Albanian communities in North Macedonia